Frank Baker Jr. (January 11, 1944 – January 28, 2010) was an American professional baseball player.

A native of Bartow, Florida, Baker played high school baseball for Franklin High School in Somerset, New Jersey, where he was inducted into their Football Hall of Fame. He signed with the Cleveland Indians in 1964 and played for them in their Minor league system for three years before joining the United States Army. In the Army, he served in the Vietnam War from 1967 to 1968, and attained the rank of private first class. After discharging from the Army in 1969, he spent most of the season with the Waterbury Indians, hitting .312 in 84 games before being promoted. He made his major league debut on July 27, and hit .256 in 52 games for Cleveland. The following season, he spent the year with the Wichita Aeros. In 1971, he divided his playing time between the Indians and the Aeros. He also played for Triple-A California affiliate Salt Lake City Angels in 1972, his last season in baseball.

In part of two season for the Indians, Baker was a .286 hitter (82-for-353) with four home runs and 38 runs batted in in 125 games. In a seven-season minors career, he hit .284 with 51 homers and 235 RBI in 703 games.

Baker died in Raleigh, North Carolina, at the age of 66, following complications from a heart failure. He is buried at Florida National Cemetery, Bushnell, Florida.

References

External links

1944 births
2010 deaths
African-American baseball players
Major League Baseball outfielders
Cleveland Indians players
Dubuque Packers players
Pawtucket Indians players
Portland Beavers players
Salinas Indians players
Salt Lake City Angels players
Waterbury Indians players
Wichita Aeros players
United States Army personnel of the Vietnam War
Baseball players from Florida
Baseball players from New Jersey
Franklin High School (New Jersey) alumni
Sportspeople from Franklin Township, Somerset County, New Jersey
United States Army soldiers
20th-century African-American sportspeople
21st-century African-American people
Burials at Florida National Cemetery